EECA may refer to:

Energy Efficiency and Conservation Authority (New Zealand)
European Electronic Component Manufacturers Association
Eastern Europe and Central Asia
Emerging Europe and Central Asia